Guiraud (1070–1123) was French bishop of Béziers.

Guiraud may also refer to:

 Alexandre Guiraud (1788–1847), French poet and author
 David Guiraud (born 1992), French politician
 Ernest Guiraud (1837–1892), French composer
 Georges Guiraud (1868–1928), French composer and organist
 Jean Guiraud (1866–1953), French historian and journalist
 Marie Rose Guiraud (1944–2020), Ivorian dancer and choreographer
 Paul Guiraud (1850–1907), French historian

See also 
 Château Guiraud, a French wine
 Saint-Guiraud, a commune in the Hérault department, France
 Guiraudo lo Ros (c. 12th century), Occitan troubador from Toulouse